MSRT may refer to:

 Windows Malicious Software Removal Tool, a virus removal tool
 Deployable Operations Group#Maritime Security Response Team (MSRT), a U.S. Coast Guard counter-terrorism unit
 Massachusetts Society of Radiologic Technicians
 Minnesota Society of Radiologic Technicians
 Ministry of Science, Research and Technology (Iran)
 MassRoots stock ticker